The 2019–20 Eastern Washington Eagles men's basketball team represented Eastern Washington University during the 2019–20 NCAA Division I men's basketball season. Led by third-year head coach Shantay Legans, the Eagles were members of the Big Sky Conference and played their home games on campus at Reese Court in Cheney, Washington. They finished the regular season at 23–8 (16–4 in Big Sky, first).

As the top seed in the conference tournament, they were slated to play ninth-seeded Sacramento State in the quarterfinals on Thursday, March 12, but the tournament was cancelled due to the COVID-19 pandemic, along with the rest of the NCAA postseason.

Previous season
The Eagles finished the 2018–19 season at 16–18 (12–8 in Big Sky, third). In the conference tournament, EWU defeated Montana State and Southern Utah to advance to the championship game, where they lost to Montana.

Roster

Schedule and results

|-
!colspan=9 style=|Non-conference regular season

|-
!colspan=9 style=| Big Sky regular season

|-
!colspan=9 style=| Big Sky tournament

References

Eastern Washington Eagles men's basketball seasons
Eastern Washington
Eastern Washington
Eastern Washington